In ethics and the social sciences, value theory involves various approaches that examine how, why, and to what degree humans value things and whether the object or subject of valuing is a person, idea, object, or anything else. Within philosophy, it is also known as ethics or axiology. 

Traditionally, philosophical investigations in value theory have sought to understand the concept of "the good". Today, some work in value theory has trended more towards empirical sciences, recording what people do value and attempting to understand why they value it in the context of psychology, sociology, and economics.

In ecological economics, value theory is separated into two types: donor-type value and receiver-type value. Ecological economists tend to believe that 'real wealth' needs an accrual-determined value as a measure of what things were needed to make an item or generate a service (H. T. Odum, Environmental Accounting: Emergy and environmental decision-making, 1996).

In other fields, theories posit the importance of values as an analytical independent variable (including those put forward by Max Weber, Émile Durkheim, Talcott Parsons, and Jürgen Habermas). Classical examples of sociological traditions which deny or downplay the question of values are institutionalism, historical materialism (including Marxism), behaviorism, pragmatic-oriented theories, postmodern philosophy and various Objectivist-oriented theories.

At the general level, there is a difference between moral and natural goods. Moral goods are those that have to do with the conduct of persons, usually leading to praise or blame. Natural goods, on the other hand, have to do with objects, not persons. For example, the statement "Mary is a good person" uses 'good' very differently than in the statement "That is good food".

Ethics is mainly focused on moral goods rather than natural goods, while economics has a concern in what is economically good for the society but not an individual person and is also interested in natural goods. However, both moral and natural goods are equally relevant to goodness and value theory, which is more general in scope.

Ethics and axiology

Intuitively, theories of value must be important to ethics. A number of useful distinctions have been made by philosophers in the treatment of value.

Intrinsic and instrumental value

It is useful to distinguish between instrumental and intrinsic values. This distinction is based on the distinction between intrinsic and extrinsic properties. First introduced by Plato in the "Republic", an instrumental value is worth having as a means for getting something else that is good (e.g., a radio is instrumentally good in order to hear music). An intrinsically valuable thing, by contrast, is worth having for itself, not as a means to something else. 

Intrinsic and instrumental goods do not constitute mutually exclusive categories: some things can be found to be both good (in themselves) while simultaneously being good for getting other things that have value.

A prominent argument in environmental ethics, made by writers like Aldo Leopold and Holmes Rolston III, is that wild nature and healthy ecosystems have intrinsic value, prior to and apart from their instrumental value as resources for humans, and should therefore be preserved. This line of argument has been articulated further in recent years by Canadian philosopher John McMurtry within the Encyclopedia of Life Support Systems published by UNESCO.

Pragmatism and contributory goodness

John Dewey (1859-1952) in his book Theory of Valuation, says goodness is the outcome of ethic valuation and a continuous balancing of "ends in view". An end in view is said to be an objective potentially adopted, which may be refined or rejected based on its consistency with other objectives or as a means to objectives already held.

Dewey's empiricist approach evinces absolute intrinsic value denial; i.e. not accepting intrinsic value as an inherent or enduring property of things. Instead, Dewey sees the appearance of intrinsic value as an illusory product of our continuous valuative activity as purposive beings. In addition to denying categorically that there is anything like intrinsic value, Dewey held the same position with regard to moral values - for Dewey, moral values are also based on a learning process, and are never intrinsic or absolute.

Another contribution of pragmatism to value theory is the idea of contributory goods with a contributory conditionality. These have the same qualities as the good thing, but need some emergent property of a whole state-of-affairs in order to be good. For example, salt is food on its own, but is far better as part of a prepared meal. In other words, such goods are only "good" when certain conditions are met. This is in contrast to other goods, which may be considered "good" in a wider variety of situations.

Kant: hypothetical and categorical goods
The thinking of Immanuel Kant greatly influenced moral philosophy. He thought of moral value as a unique and universally identifiable property, as an absolute value rather than a relative value. He showed that many practical goods are good only in states-of-affairs described by a sentence containing an "if" clause, e.g., in the sentence, "Sunshine is only good if you do not live in the desert." Further, the "if" clause often described the category in which the judgment was made (art, science, etc.). Kant described these as "hypothetical goods", and tried to find a "categorical" good that would operate across all categories of judgment without depending on an "if-then" clause.

An influential result of Kant's search was the idea of a good will being the only intrinsic good. Moreover, Kant saw a good will as acting in accordance with a moral command, the "Categorical Imperative": "Act according to those maxims that you could will to be universal law." but should not be confused with the Ethic of Reciprocity or Golden Rule, e.g. Mt. 7:12. Whereas the golden rule states that "One should treat others as one would like others to treat oneself," Kant asks us to analyze whether an act can be performed simultaneously by everyone without exception. For example, murder cannot be performed simultaneously by everyone, one set of people would have to live and the other die. That disparity is an exception. The act cannot be performed without exception, therefore it fails the categorical imperative. Contrast this with the golden rule which is subjective to the individual. Following the logic of the golden rule, if I wanted someone to kill me, then it would be acceptable for me to kill others, because I would be doing to others what I would want done to me. This is very important to keep in mind, because Kant's categorical imperative avoids this flaw. From this, and a few other axioms, Kant developed a moral system that would apply to any "praiseworthy person".

Kantian philosophers believe that any general definition of goodness must define goods that are categorical in the sense that Kant intended.

Sociology

In sociology, value theory is concerned with personal values which are popularly held by a community, and how those values might change under particular conditions. Different groups of people may hold or prioritize different kinds of values influencing social behavior.

Methods of study range from questionnaire surveys to participant observation. 
Values can be socially attributed. What the community perceives as of paramount significance to them denotes or decipher their social attributes.

Economics

Economic analysis emphasizes goods sought in a market and tends to use the consumer's choices as evidence (revealed preference) that various products are of economic value. In this view, religious or political struggle over what "goods" are available in the marketplace is inevitable, and consensus on some core questions about body and society and ecosystems affected by the transaction, are outside the market's goods so long as they are unowned.

However, some natural goods seem to also be moral  goods. For example, those things that are owned by a person may be said to be natural goods, but over which a particular individual(s) may have moral claims. So it is necessary to make another distinction: between moral and non-moral goods. A non-moral  good is something that is desirable for someone or other; despite the name to the contrary, it may include moral goods. A moral good is anything which an actor is considered to be morally obligated to strive toward.

When discussing non-moral goods, one may make a useful distinction between inherently serviced and material goods in the marketplace (or its exchange value), versus perceived intrinsic and experiential goods to the buyer. A strict service economy model takes pains to distinguish between the goods and service guarantees to the market, and that of the service and experience to the consumer.

Sometimes, moral and natural goods can conflict. The value of natural "goods" is challenged by such issues as addiction. The issue of addiction also brings up the distinction between economic and moral goods, where an economic good is whatever stimulates economic growth. For instance, some claim that cigarettes are a "good" in the economic sense, as their production can employ tobacco growers and doctors who treat lung cancer. Many people would agree that cigarette smoking is not morally "good", nor naturally "good," but still recognize that it is economically good, which means, it has exchange value, even though it may have a negative public good or even be bad for a person's body (not the same as "bad for the person" necessarily – consider the issue of suicide). 

In ecological economics value theory is separated into two types: donor-type value and receiver-type value. Ecological economists tend to believe that 'real wealth' needs a donor-determined value as a measure of what things were needed to make an item or generate a service (H. T. Odum, Environmental Accounting: Emergy and environmental decision-making, 1996). An example of receiver-type value is 'market value', or 'willingness to pay', the principal method of accounting used in neo-classical economics.  In contrast, both Marx's labour theory of value and the emergy concept are conceived as donor-type value. Emergy theorists believe that this conception of value has relevance to all of philosophy, economics, sociology and psychology as well as Environmental Science.

Silvio Gesell denied value theory in economics. He thought that value theory is useless and prevents economics from becoming science and that a currency administration guided by value theory is doomed to sterility and inactivity.

See also

 Aesthetics
 Anthropological theories of value
 Axiological ethics
 Baden School
 Cultural Institutions Studies
 Graded absolutism
 Illegalism
 Intuitionism
 Labor theory of value
 Law of value
 Logic
 Morality
 Friedrich Nietzsche
 Normative science
 Practical philosophy
 Pirsig's Metaphysics of Quality
 Rationality
 Rationality and power
 Social contract
 Summum bonum
 Thick concept
 Ultimate importance
 Value-added theory
 Value engineering

References

Further reading
 Nicholas Rescher. 2010. Axiogenesis: An Essay in Metaphysical Optimalism. Lexington Books.

Value (ethics)
Axiological theories
 

it:Teoria dei valori
zh:價值觀